The Roman Square is a town square in Podgorica, Montenegro. It's the town's major business district and boasts some of the highest real-estate prices in Podgorica. The Roman Square is colloquially known as Vektra Square, owing its name to the Vektra business centre, the first major building on the square.

Location
The square is bordered by Moskovska ulica (Moscow street) to the east and George Washington boulevard to the west.  Saint Peter of Cetinje boulevard and Bulevar Revolucije (Revolution boulevard) create the square's northern and southern borders, respectively. Rimski Trg is connected to the Cathedral of the Resurrection of Christ and Maxim business centre with an underground pedestrian passage, going under the St. Peter of Cetinje boulevard. The underground passage is currently the only one in the city.

Characteristics
 
The square is built around a large central fountain, and covers an area of 20.000 square metres. Along with numerous café's and restaurants, it also hosts the following buildings:
 Business centre Vektra
 Best Western Premier Hotel Montenegro
 Telenor Montenegro headquarters
 Crnogorski Telekom and T-Mobile Montenegro headquarters
 Business centre Kruševac
 Prva Banka, CKB and Addiko Bank headquarters
 Montenegrin Electrical Transmission System dispatching centre

The following government ministries are (at least partially) located on the square:
 Ministry of Economy
 Ministry of Science
 Ministry of Education and Sport
 Ministry of Labor and Social Welfare
 Ministry of Information Society and Telecommunications
 Ministry of Minority Rights
 Ministry of Health
 Ministry of Agriculture and Rural Development
 Ministry of Transportation and Maritime Affairs

References

Squares in Podgorica